Campillai and Campillay is a Chilean surname of indigenous Diaguita origin. Notable people with the surname include:
Yasna Provoste Campillay, politician
Fabiola Campillai, victim of police brutality and senator-elect

References

Surnames of Chilean origin
Diaguita